The 1983 WCT World Doubles was a men's tennis tournament played on indoor carpet courts at National Exhibition Centre in Birmingham, England that was part of the 1983 World Championship Tennis circuit. It was the tour finals for the doubles season of the WCT Tour section. The tournament was held from January 4 through January 9, 1983.

Final

Doubles

 Heinz Günthardt /  Balázs Taróczy defeated  Brian Gottfried /  Raúl Ramírez 6–3, 7–5, 7–6

References

World Championship Tennis World Doubles
1983 World Championship Tennis circuit
1983 in English tennis